The Nicola Valley Memorial Arena is a 1,000-seat multi-purpose year-round arena in Merritt, British Columbia, Canada. It is home to the Merritt Centennials ice hockey team, the Merritt Minor Hockey Association, recreational hockey, old-timers hockey, commercial hockey, and First Nations hockey programs.

Off-season activities include seasonal hockey schools, First Nations pow wows, home shows, bingos, ball hockey, roller skating, volleyball, and circuses.

The Arena is located on Mamette Avenue in downtown Merritt.

External links
Official website

British Columbia Hockey League arenas
Indoor arenas in British Columbia
Indoor ice hockey venues in Canada
Indoor lacrosse venues in Canada
Merritt Centennials
Sports venues in British Columbia